The Our Lady of the Ark of the Covenant Church (Founded in ) is a religious building belonging to the Catholic Church and is located on the northwestern edge of the town of Abu Ghosh in the central Israel. The church is at an altitude of 756 meters above sea level.

History
In 1141, near the area where the village of Abu Ghosh is located, the Knights Hospitaller founded another church, about 400 meters east of the Church of Our Lady of the Ark of the Covenant. The structure built in 1924, according to tradition takes the place of the house of Abinadab where the Ark of the Covenant rested for twenty years, until King David took Jerusalem. It was built on the site of a previous Byzantine church of the fifth century is recognizable by the statue of Mary carrying the baby Jesus in her arms on the roof. The interior is decorated with simplicity. Its walls are painted white, and the great apse has a large Latin cross.

The modern church now stands on a mound which was established by the Order of the Sisters of St. Joseph of the Apparition. In 2018, since the dedication of the statue of the Lady of La Vang in the garden, this church has been the meeting place of the Vietnamese pilgrims. On site activities besides religious services are held as ″Abu Ghosh music festival″.

See also
Resurrection Church, Abu Ghosh
Church of Our Lady Mary of Zion

References

Roman Catholic churches in Israel
Buildings and structures in Abu Ghosh
Roman Catholic churches completed in 1924
Church buildings in the Kingdom of Jerusalem
20th-century Roman Catholic church buildings in Israel